Consort Xian (喻賢妃; died 1421), of the Yu clan, was a consort of the Yongle Emperor.

She famously committed adultery by having an affair with a eunuch. This was one of the incidents which caused the mass execution in the emperor's harem, where many of the emperor's concubines, their maids and eunuchs were executed. They were accused of having participated in a murder plot against the emperor.

Titles 
During the reign of the Hongwu Emperor (r. 1368–1398):
Lady Yu (喻氏)
During the reign of the Yongle Emperor (r. 1402–1424)
Consort Xian (賢妃;  from unknown date)
Consort Zhaoshunxian (昭順賢妃; from 1421)
Consort Zhongjingzhaoshunxian  (忠敬昭順賢妃; from 1421)

References 

Year of birth unknown
1421 deaths
Consorts of the Yongle Emperor